Jiangshan is a county-level city located in Quzhou prefecture-level city, in the southwest of Zhejiang Province, China, bordering Jiangxi province to the west. Located about 250 kilometers southwest of Hangzhou, the provincial capital, it is the only county-level city in Quzhou. In 1999, Jiangshan's population stood at 563,196. The city is named aptly: Jiang means river and Shan means mountain; a river runs through the city and scenic Mt. Jianglang sits on its border.

USA Today described Jiangshan as a "fairly prosperous city in one of China's most developed provinces".

The Jiangshanian Age of the Cambrian Period of geological time is named for Jiangshan.

Administrative division
It has 3 Subdistricts, 11 Towns, 5 Townships, 13 residential communities, and 292 administrative villages:
 Subdistricts: Hushan Subdistrict, Shuangta Subdistrict, Qinghu Subdistrict
 Town: Town on more than four all towns, villages and towns celebrate, Fenglin Township, the town of Gap, benches town, shimenzhen, Big Town, the altar stone town, new town pond, Nianbadu town.
 Township: Dachen Township, Bowl Kiln Township, Tangyuankou Township, Zhangcun Township, and Baoan Township

Climate

Education
Among the handful of schools in Jiangshan is Jiangshan Experimental Primary School, which is part of Zhejiang University's Global TEFL network. The program sends native English-speakers to their network schools to teach English for periods of 2–4 weeks. Aside from these teachers, Jiangshan sees few Westerners because of its relative geographical obscurity. Jiangshan High School is also in Jiangshan.

Transportation 
The area is served by Jiangshan railway station.

References

 
Quzhou
Cities in Zhejiang